Yim Fun Fong is a former Chinese actress and Cantonese opera performer from Hong Kong. Fong is credited with over 150 films. Fong has a star at Avenue of Stars in Hong Kong.

Early life 
In 1928, Fong was born as Chow Tung Si in Enping, Guangdong Province, China. Fong grew up with a single (adopted) mother. Fong's real name is Leung Yin-fong [In this Chinese name, the family name is Leung (梁).]. Fong learned Cantonese opera from Kwok Sing Theatre.

Education 
In 1995, Fong received a Doctorate of Humane Letters award from California Lutheran University. In 2004, Fong received the award Doctor of Social Sciences, honoris causa conferred by Lingnan University. In 2013, Fong received a Doctor of Social Science, honoris causa, from the Chinese University of Hong Kong.

Career 
In 1937, Fong joined Sing Sau Nin Opera Troupe. At age 10, Fong began her Cantonese opera training. By age 13, Fong earned the status of supporting actress in Cantonese opera in Guangzhou, China. By age 16, Fong earned the status of female lead actress in Cantonese opera.

Fong is known as Queen of Hudan and her unique singing style in Cantonese Opera is known as the Fong style.

In 1950, Fong debuted as a film actress in Hong Kong. Fong appeared in The Flower Drops by the Red Chamber, a 1950 drama film directed by Ng Wui. Fong also appeared in drama and comedy films.

In 1953, Fong founded the Sun Yim Yeung Opera Troupe. In 1953, Fong also founded Zhili Film Company.

Fong appeared in A Cadet in Love's Battle, a 1953 comedy film and Zhili's inaugural production directed by Chiang Wai-Kwong. Fong and Yam Kim-fai performed Cantonese opera both on stage and in many films including Swallows Come Home (1958).

In 1959, Fong retired from the entertainment industry.

Fong's last film was Joy To the World, a 1963 Cantonese opera film directed by Lo Yung. Fong is credited with over 150 films.

Fong's last film by her own Chik Lei (Zhili) Film Company was Follow the Husband, a 1959 film produced by Law Kim-Long, the male lead. Fong worked closely with Law both on stage and in films.

In September 2012, with Fong's donation, Shaw College of The Chinese University of Hong Kong created “The Art of Fong Yim Fun Sustainability Project.” In August 2014, the Fong Yim Fun Art Gallery was formally opened.

Repertoire 
This is only a partial list and all but one* were the work of playwright Tang Ti-sheng.
 The Summer Snow (aka The Injustice to Dou E)
 Tung Siu-Yen
 Butterfly Lovers*
 Swallows Come Home
 The Immortal Zhang Yuqiao, the Most Respectable Courtesan (see Jian Youwen) 
 Feather Fan Under Spring Lantern
 Beauty Fades From Twelve Ladies' Tower
 Goddess of the Luo River
 A Beauty's Flourishing Fragrant (aka A Pedestal of Rouge Fragrance or Sweet Dew on a Beautiful Flower)
 The Dream Encounter Between Emperor Wu of Han and Lady Wai (debut opposite Sit Gok Sin) 
 Mrs. Cheng (aka A Forsaken Woman) 
 The Love Song in the Scripture

Filmography

Films 
This is a partial list of films.
 1950 The Flower Drops by the Red Chamber
 1950 The Story of Tung Siu-Yen - Tung Siu-Yen
 1950 A Girl Named Liang Lengyan (Part 1 and Part 2) - Leung Lang-Yim
 1952 Private Lives of Opera and Movie Stars - as Herself
 1953 Swallows' Return - Luk Sheung-Hing
 1955 Backyard Adventures - Lover 
 1955 The Faithful Wife 
 1956 Funny Girl
 1958 The Tragic Story of Liang Shanbo and Zhu Yingtai
 1963 Joy To the World

Awards 
 1995 Member of the Most Excellent Order of the British Empire (MBE).
 1998 Honorary Fellow. Hong Kong Academy for Performing Arts.
 2003 Bronze Bauhinia Star (BBS) as Dr Yang Leung Yin-fong, Katie, BBS. Presented by the Hong Kong Special Administrative Region Government. 
 Star. Avenue of Stars. Tsim Sha Tsui waterfront in Hong Kong.
 36th Hong Kong Film Awards, Lifetime Achievement

Personal life 
In 1949, Fong moved back to Hong Kong. In 1959, Fong married Dr. Yang Kyung Waung.

Gallery

See also 
 Chinese Artists Association of Hong Kong
 California Lutheran University#Kwan Fong Gallery of Art and Culture
 Hung Sin Nui

References

External links 
 Liang, Yanfang, (1929 -) WorldCat ID
 
 
 Fong at scmp.com (paid subscription required)
 Yang Leung, Katie Yin-fong (Fong Yim Fun) at lawinsider.com

1928 births
Hong Kong Cantonese opera actresses
Hong Kong film actresses
Living people
Members of the Order of the British Empire
Recipients of the Bronze Bauhinia Star